The Ilek (Elek) is a river in the Aktobe Region, Kazakhstan, and Orenburg Oblast, Russia.

The river basin is of archeological significance. There are burial sites of ancient Kurgan (Indo-European) cultures.

Course
The Ilek is a left tributary of the Ural. It is a steppe river, flowing at the southern end of the Ural Mountains. Two main cities lie on the banks of the Ilek River: Sol-Iletsk and Aqtöbe (alternate spelling: Aktöbe, Aktyubinsk).

The Ilek remains the most polluted water body in the Ural-Caspian basin. The content of boron and chromium in the river is caused by the tailing ponds of former chemical plants via ground water. The pollution level varies from "polluted" to "very polluted". Tributaries of the Ilek include the Bolshaya Khobda and the Kargaly.

Fauna
There are catfish, carp, perch, pike, etc. in the Ilek. It is used for water supply of industrial enterprises, irrigation of agricultural lands.

See also
List of rivers of Kazakhstan

References

External links

Rivers of Kazakhstan
Rivers of Orenburg Oblast
International rivers of Asia
Ural basin